B. F. Zeidman (October 4, 1896 – August 7, 1970) was a Hollywood film producer whose long film career began while he was still in his teens during the era of silent film.

Early life
He was born Benjamin "Bennie" Zeidman at Philadelphia, the middle of five children raised by Joseph and Clara Zeidman. Bennie's birth-mother most likely died sometime around the turn of the century leaving his father to wed Clara about 1902. His father was Russian, as were his mother and step-mother, and supported his family as an owner of a Philadelphia area butcher shop.

Career
As early as 1911 Bennie was doing publicity for Lubin Studios, and had gained the nickname "Bennie of Lubinville." In 1914 Bennie worked as publicity manager for the Liberty Motion Picture Company, and then for Eaco Films in New York. Over the next several years he would work as publicist for D. W. Griffith, Fine Arts Films, Yorke-Metro Studios, and Douglas Fairbanks. In 1922 Bennie produced the film Where Is My Wandering Boy Tonight?, and would go on to produce or co-produce some twenty-six films over the following twenty-two years including Prison Train, Grand Central Murder, and the 1936 documentary Beneath the Seas. His last two productions were the Laurel and Hardy films Air Raid Wardens and Nothing But Trouble.

At 101 pounds and just under five feet, Zeidman was once described as the "smallest press agent in captivity".

Death
Bennie Zeidman died in 1970 at the age of 73 in Los Angeles.

Filmography

As producer

As actor

As editor
 The Fleet's In (1928)
 Just Married (1928)

As writer
 Figures Don't Lie (1927)

References

External links

Film producers from Pennsylvania
1896 births
1970 deaths
Businesspeople from Philadelphia
American people of Russian descent
American public relations people
20th-century American businesspeople